Sir Kenneth Henry Grange, CBE, PPCSD, RDI (born 17 July 1929, London) is a British industrial designer, renowned for a wide range of designs for familiar, everyday objects.

Career
Grange's career began as a drafting assistant with the architect Jack Howe in the 1950s. His independent career started rather accidentally with commissions for exhibition stands, but by the early 1970s he was a founding-partner in Pentagram, an interdisciplinary design consultancy.

Grange's career has spanned more than half a century, and many of his designs became – and are still – familiar items in the household or on the street. These designs include the first UK parking meters for Venner, kettles and food mixers for Kenwood, razors for Wilkinson Sword, cameras for Kodak, typewriters for Imperial, clothes irons for Morphy Richards, cigarette lighters for Ronson, washing machines for Bendix, pens for Parker, bus shelters, Reuters computers, and regional Royal Mail postboxes.

Grange was also responsible for the aerodynamics, interior layout and exterior styling of the nose cone of British Rail's High Speed Train (known as the InterCity 125) and also involved in the design of the 1997 LTI TX1 version of the famous London taxicab. He has carried out many commissions for Japanese companies.

One quality of much of Grange's design work is that it is not based on just the styling of a product. His design concepts arise from a fundamental reassessment of the purpose, function and use of the product. He has also said that his attitude to designing any product is that he wants it to be "a pleasure to use". Grange was a pioneer of user-centred design, aiming to eliminate what he sees as the "contradictions" inherent in products that fail to embody ease-of-use.

Since retiring from Pentagram in 1997, Grange continues to work independently. Recent work has included door handles for Ize Ltd., desk and floor lamps for Anglepoise, and a chair for the elderly for Hitch Mylius. 

The First Production HST power car, 43 002, was repainted by Great Western Railway in to the original British Rail Inter-City livery, and then named in his honour by Grange on 2 May 2016 at St Philip's Marsh GWR HST depot in Bristol, on the occasion of the 40th anniversary of the first passenger services of the Intercity 125. Grange later visited York in October 2016, and 'signed' power car 43 185 using spray paint. Grange is the Honorary President of the 125 Group which has restored the original prototype HST Power Car and aims to preserve operational examples of the subsequent production HST vehicles when they are finally retired from service. After withdrawal from GWR service, 43002 joined the National Collection in September 2019 and went on display at  Locomotion.

Honours
Grange was knighted for services to design in the 2013 New Year Honours. Grange's designs have won ten Design Council Awards,
the Duke of Edinburgh's prize for Elegant Design in 1966,
and in 2001 he was awarded the Prince Philip Designers Prize – an award honouring a lifetime achievement. He has won the Gold Medal of the Chartered Society of Designers, and is a member of the Royal Society of Arts' élite Faculty of 'Royal Designers for Industry'. Grange has been awarded honorary Doctorates by the Royal College of Art, De Montfort University, Plymouth University, Heriot-Watt University, and the Open University.

The Design Museum held a major retrospective exhibition of Grange's work, July–October 2011. The RSA has an audio recording of Grange in a discussion of his work.

In media 
In April 2022 Grange was featured in the BBC Two series Secrets of the Museum.

References

External links 
 The Brits Who Designed the Modern World Artsnight – Series 4: 7, BBC Two
 Sir Kenneth Grange PPCSD Anglepoise
Discussion with Grange on his design of the Signature Diamond loudspeakers for Bowers & Wilkins

1929 births
Living people
British industrial designers
Commanders of the Order of the British Empire
Knights Bachelor
History of rail transport in the United Kingdom
Pentagram partners (past and present)